Pachia can refer to:
 Pachia (Anafi), island in the commune Anafi, Greece
 Pachia (Nisyros), island in the commune Nisyros, Greece
 Pachia, Covasna, village in Brateș, Covasna, Romania
 Pachia, Kamrup, village in Kamrup, Assam, India
 Pachía District in Tacna province, Peru

See also
 Pacheia Ammos, village in municipality Ierapetra, Crete, Greece